Fredrik Bull-Hansen (2 August 1927 – 1 March 2018) was a Norwegian military officer, a General in the Norwegian Army. He served as Chief of Defence of Norway from 1984 to 1987.

Bull-Hansen was decorated Commander with Star of the Royal Norwegian Order of St. Olav in 1984. He received the Grand Cross of the Finnish Order of the White Rose and the Swedish Order of the Polar Star. Commander with Star of the Order of St. Olav. Among his other honours are the Grand Cross with Star of the Order of Merit of the Federal Republic of Germany and Commander of the Legion of Merit.

References

1927 births
2018 deaths
People from Skien
Norwegian Army generals
Commanders Grand Cross of the Order of the Polar Star
Commanders of the Legion of Merit
Knights Commander of the Order of Merit of the Federal Republic of Germany
Members of the Norwegian Academy
Chiefs of Defence (Norway)